Fertility clinics are medical clinics that assist couples, and sometimes individuals, who want to become parents but for medical reasons have been unable to achieve this goal via the natural course. Clinics apply a number of diagnosis tests and sometimes very advanced medical treatments to achieve conceptions and pregnancies.

Clinic staff
Fertility clinics are staffed with trained personnel including reproductive endocrinologists, embryologists, sonographers, nurses, lab technicians and administrative staff.  Additional specialists from acupuncture, hypnotherapy, and nutrition may also be part of the team. You will need one person for each 150 cycles of ICSI (Intra-Cytoplasmic Sperm Injection)/IVF (In Vitro Fertilization). If you are less than that you may have problems, if you have that you do not have problems unless some people are not able to work (pregnancy or diseases) and if you have more than that you are in optimal conditions.

Diagnosis
Fertility clinics look to both males and females for diagnosis of fertility problems. Diagnosis has shown that fertility problems arise 35% of the time from males, 35% from female, 20% from combined issues, and 10% from unexplained causes. For the male, semen collection is a standard diagnostic test to ascertain problems with the semen quality, while females may undergo a number of tests including an ovulation analysis, x-ray of fallopian tubes and uterus, and laparoscopy. They may also perform ultrasounds by a sonographer and advanced pregnancy tests.

Treatment
Treatment may include ovulation induction, surgical interventions, artificial insemination, such as intrauterine insemination (IUI), in vitro fertilization (IVF), or the use of an egg donor or a sperm donor. In vitro fertilization is the most well known of the assisted reproductive technology procedures performed at a fertility clinic. Advanced male infertility treatments such as TESA (Testicular Epididymal Sperm Aspiration) is also provided by fertility clinics these days.

Comparing clinics
The Centers for Disease Control requires outcome data be reported to the Society of Assisted Reproductive Technology (SART) which is the organization that compiles statistics. Fertility clinics are often compared by these IVF success rates.  However, it is important to note that SART puts a caution at bottom of each report that reads "Patient characteristics vary among programs; therefore, these data should not be used for comparing clinics."  A consultation with many fertility clinics is always a good option to get a more complete comparison for a patients specific situation and needs.

In fiction
Medical dramas set in a fertility clinic include Inconceivable, which ran for two episodes in 2005 before being cancelled, and The Family Man, a British series in three parts. Furthermore, Private Practice is set in a clinic that offers fertility services to a large extent. The Gilmore Girls character Paris Geller was revealed to be running a fertility clinic of her own in the revival series Gilmore Girls: A Year in the Life.

See also
Sperm bank
Sperm donor
Egg donor
Surrogacy
Third party reproduction
Embryo donation
Artificial insemination
IVF
Reproductive medicine
Intracytoplasmic Sperm Injection (ICSI)

References

Fertility medicine
Clinics